The following highways in Virginia have been known as State Route 95:
 State Route 95 (Virginia 1933-1953), now State Route 805                              
 Interstate 95 in Virginia, 1957–present